Břeclav is a town in the South Moravian Region of the Czech Republic. It has about 24,000 inhabitants.

Administrative parts
Town parts of Charvátská Nová Ves and Poštorná are administrative parts of Břeclav.

Etymology

The town's name is derived from the Czech name of the founder of the local castle, Duke Bretislav I. The former German name was probably derived from the name of a Slavic tribe which lived in the area.

Geography
It borders the Austrian town Bernhardsthal.

Břeclav is situated in the Lower Morava Valley lowland in the warmest part of the country. It lies on the Thaya River. There is wild thick riparian forest composed of deciduous trees in the southern part of the municipal territory.

History

6th–10th centuries

The area was settled by first Slavic tribes already in the 6th century. In the late 8th century, a large Slavic gord, today called Pohansko (meaning "a paganish place"), was established southeast of the today's town. In the 9th century, it became a significant centre of Great Moravia. An agricultural settlement probably existed in the area of Old Břeclav, and the gord served as a hiding place for its inhabitants. In the 10th century it was abandoned.

11th–15th centuries
After 1041, a border castle was established here by Duke Bretislav I. The first written mention of Břeclav is from 1046, when it was referred by its Latin name Bretyzlawe. In the second half of the 13th century, the castle was rebuilt to a massive Romanesque fortress. The castle often changed owners. At the beginning of the 15th century, it was acquired by the House of Liechtenstein.

During the Hussite Wars the castle became a military base of the Hussites and the nearby settlement was looted. The inhabitants had to flee and founded a new market town below the castle on the other side of the Thaya river, called Nová Břeclav ("New Břeclav"). The original spot has been called Stará Břeclav ("Old Břeclav") since that time.

16th–19th centuries

In 1534, the Břeclav manor was acquired by the Zierotins. The family rebuilt the castle to a Renaissance residence, which also retained its military function. In the 16th century, the prosperity with flourishing agriculture, crafts and science occurred. The development ended with the Thirty Years' War. After the Battle of White Mountain, the Břeclav manor was confiscated to Zierotins. In 1638, the Liechtensteins bought the devastated manor.

Břeclav's Jewish community was first documented in the 16th century, although some individual Jews may have arrived earlier, in the 14th or early 15th centuries. The Jewish population became extinct during the Thirty Years' War. New Jewish settlers came in 1650.

The post-war recovery was slow. In 1742, Břeclav was destroyed by a large fire. Until the 1830s, both Břeclav and Old Břeclav were insignificant agricultural small market towns and together had about 3,000 inhabitants. In 1836–1839, the railway from Brno to Vienna was built and the economic development started. Lumber and food factories were established, and the population began to grow. In 1872, Břeclav was promoted to a town.

Modern history
In 1919, three original municipalities merged (Břeclav, Old Břeclav and Jewish Municipality of Břeclav). In 1938–1945, Břeclav was a part of Nazi Germany, although the town's population was mostly Czech-speaking. The Jewish community disappeared as a result of the Holocaust. The German population was expelled after World War II. In 1974, Poštorná and Charvátská Nová Ves, which were parts of Lower Austria until the Treaty of Saint-Germain-en-Laye, were joined.

Northern edge of Břeclav was heavily damaged by the 2021 South Moravia tornado.

Demographics

Transport
Břeclav railway station is an important hub in the railroad network. It is located at the intersection of the routes to and from Brno – Prague, Ostrava – Kraków/Katowice (Poland), Kúty – Bratislava (Slovakia) and Hohenau an der March – Vienna (Austria). In addition, a local railway to Znojmo also branches out from the station. There is a rail border crossing Břeclav/Bernhardsthal to Austria.

The D2 motorway, linking Brno with the Slovak border, and further with Bratislava, passes through the northern part of the town.

Sights

The Břeclav Castle was rebuilt into its current neo-Gothic artificial ruins form in the first half of the 19th century. It was rebuilt by the Liechtensteins during the establishment of Lednice–Valtice Cultural Landscape. Today it is owned by the town. One of its towers serves as an observation tower.

The parish Church of Saint Wenceslaus on the T. G. Masaryka Square is a contemporary architecture from 1992 to 1995 on the spot of a Baroque one destroyed in World War II. The second parish church is the Church of the Visitation of Our Lady in Poštorná. it is a unique neo-Gothic structure with a cupola built in 1895–1898 with use of special bricks from local factory.

The old small synagogue from 1697 was replaced by a larger building in 1868. In 1888, it was renovated in the neo-Romanesque style and with Moorish Revival elements inside. Nowadays it houses a part of the town museum. The Jewish cemetery was founded in the 17th century. The oldest from the 300 preserved tombstones is from the 18th century. The former Jewish school (today called Liechtenstein's House) in the middle of the former Jewish ghetto serves as a main building of the town's museum and gallery.

The western and southern rural part of Břeclav lies in the Lednice–Valtice Cultural Landscape, which has been a UNESCO World Heritage Site since 1996. One of its main features, located in Břeclav's territory, is the Apollo Temple. It was built by design of Joseph Kornhäusel in 1817–1819.

Lednice–Valtice Cultural Landscape also includes Pohansko, an archaeological site from Great-Moravian times in the middle of the riparian forests. The archaelogical findings are presented in the Pohansko Castle. This small hunting castle was built here by the Liechtensteins in the Empire style in 1810–1812. In the Pohansko area is also the small Light Fortification Museum in a renovated bunker.

Notable people
Julius Lieban (1857–1940), Austro-German operatic tenor
Rudolf Carl (1899–1987), Austrian actor
Zdeňka Pokorná (1905–2007), resistance fighter
František Kobzík (1914–1944), rower and soldier
Jan Švéda (1931–2007), rower, Olympic medalist
Václav Pavkovič (1936–2019), rower, Olympic medalist
Friedrich Kratochwil (born 1944), German political scientist and professor
Ivan Kučírek (born 1946), cyclist

Twin towns – sister cities

Břeclav is twinned with:

 Andrychów, Poland
 Brezová pod Bradlom, Slovakia
 Lysá nad Labem, Czech Republic
 Nový Bor, Czech Republic
 Priverno, Italy
 Trnava, Slovakia

Partner towns
Břeclav also cooperates with:
 Šentjernej, Slovenia
 Zwentendorf, Austria

Gallery

References

External links

Official tourist portal

Populated places in Břeclav District
Cities and towns in the Czech Republic
Moravian Slovakia
Austria–Czech Republic border crossings